Joshua Lenz (born September 22, 1990) is a former American football wide receiver. He played college football at Iowa State, and signed with the Chicago Bears as an undrafted free agent in 2013. He spent several years in the NFL on practice squads, only ever being on the active roster with the Colts.

College career
Lenz played for Iowa State. In 4 seasons with the Cyclones, he recorded 96 receptions for 1,213 yards and 10 touchdowns.

Professional career

Pro Day
Lenz (5-foot-11 1/4, 201) was not invited to the Combine, but put himself on the draft radar with forty times of 4.36 and 4.37 at the ISU Pro Day. He added a 38.5-inch vertical and 10-foot-1 broad jump.

Chicago Bears
Lenz signed as an undrafted free agent with the Chicago Bears on April 28, 2013. He was mostly used as a punt returner in preseason football and was released on August 31, 2013, after totaling 7 punt returns for 60 yards and one lost fumble.

Seattle Seahawks
On October 8, 2013, Lenz was signed to the practice squad of the Seattle Seahawks. He was released on October 22 to make room for Ricardo Lockette. Lenz was then re-signed to the practice squad on October 30, and was released again on November 6, this time to make room for Phil Bates.

Indianapolis Colts
Lenz was signed to the Indianapolis Colts practice squad on November 11, 2013, when Da'Rick Rogers was promoted to the active roster. On January 6, 2014, Lenz was promoted to the active roster for the first time in his career. After playing in the 2014 preseason, Lenz was released and re-signed to the practice squad on August 31. Lenz was waived by the Colts on May 20, 2015.

Cleveland Browns 
On May 30, Lenz signed with the Cleveland Browns. On September 5, 2015, he was waived by the Browns.

Houston Texans
Lenz signed to the practice squad of the Houston Texans on October 13, 2015. He signed a futures contract on January 13, 2016.
On August 30, 2016, Lenz was waived by the Texans.

References

External links
 Iowa State Cyclones bio
 Indianapolis Colts bio
 
 

1990 births
Living people
Indianapolis Colts players
Cleveland Browns players
American football wide receivers
Iowa State Cyclones football players
Players of American football from Iowa
People from Dubuque, Iowa
Seattle Seahawks players